Edward Jones (birth unknown – death unknown), also known by the nicknames of "Ned" or "Neddy"/"Naddy" , was a Welsh rugby union and professional rugby league footballer who played in the 1900s and 1910s.

Background
Ned Jones was born in Maesteg, Wales.

Playing career

International honours
Ned Jones won a cap for Wales while at Broughton Rangers in 1913.

Challenge Cup Final appearances
Ned Jones played  in Broughton Rangers' 4-0 victory over Wigan in the 1911 Challenge Cup Final during the 1910–11 season at The Willows, Salford, in front of a crowd of 15,006.

References

External links

Broughton Rangers players
Bryncethin RFC players
Glamorgan County RFC players
Maesteg RFC players
Place of death missing
Pontycymmer RFC players
Rugby league halfbacks
Rugby league players from Maesteg
Rugby union players from Maesteg
Wales national rugby league team players
Welsh rugby league players
Welsh rugby union players
Wigan Warriors players
Year of birth missing
Year of death missing